Emily Underhill Luchetti (née Emily White Underhill; born 1957) is an American pastry chef, cookbook author, and educator. She is a 2004 James Beard award-winner for Outstanding Pastry Chef.

Biography 
Emily Luchetti was born in 1957 and raised in Corning, New York. She attended Denison University and graduated with a B.A. degree (1979) in Sociology. She continued her studies at New York Restaurant School (now The Art Institute of New York City) in Manhattan. After graduation she lived in Paris for a year, studying under chef Gérard Pangaud. In 1984, she married investor and businessperson, Peter Luchetti.

Luchetti has worked with New York City restaurants including David Leiderman's Manhattan Market; and at Sheila Lukins and Julee Rosso's The Silver Palate. In San Francisco, Luchetti has worked at restaurants including Mark Franz and Pat Kuleto's Farallon from 1997 to 2014; Mark Franz's Waterbar from 2008 to 2014; and Stars and with Jeremiah Tower from 1987 until July 1995. She also co-owned Star Bake, a retail bakery, with Jeremiah Tower.

Luchetti is a 2004 James Beard award-winner for Outstanding Pastry Chef. In 2012, she became a James Beard Foundation "Who's Who of Food & Beverage in America" inductee.

She is Dean of the International Culinary Center, founded at the French Culinary Institute in 1984, where she has developed a state-of-the art curriculum because she desired to influence the thinking of a new generation of pastry chefs.

Filmography 
Luchetti has appeared on the television series Great Chefs, with appearances in Great Chefs - The Women, and Great Chefs - Great Cities. As well as appeared in the Food Network's The Ultimate Kitchen, Sweet Dreams, Cookin' Live with Sara Moulton, Essential Pepin, Martha Stewart Living, and Sara's Secrets.

Publications

References

External links 
Profile at TVGuide

1957 births
American chefs
Living people
Pastry chefs
People from the San Francisco Bay Area
Cuisine of the San Francisco Bay Area
American women chefs
21st-century American women
Chefs from San Francisco